is a Japanese voice actor who graduated from the Aichi Prefecture. He is employed by the talent agency 81 Produce. He was also asked by SNK to participate as a member of SNK's character image band, Band of Fighters based on the game series King of Fighters, under the role of Iori Yagami.

Filmography

Television animation
1990s
Pretty Sammy (1995-1997) (Binpachi Hagakure)
Azuki-chan (1995-1998) (Azuki's father)
After War Gundam X (1996) (Rukusu) (eps. 25-28)
Martian Successor Nadesico (1996-1997) (Supreme Commander Haruki Kusakabe)
Paketsu de Gohan (1996-) (Richard, Sage)
Sakura Diaries (1997) (Tatsuhiko Mashu)
Bomberman B-Daman Bakugaiden (1998-1999) (Drakken)
Case Closed (1998-)(Kenji (eps. 121-122), Noriyuki Shirakawa (eps. 217-218), Nobukazu Michiba (ep. 370), Kishiharu Torakura (eps. 712-715), Mineto Mayama (eps. 927-928))
Gasaraki (1998) (Tamotsu Hayakawa) (ep. 1)
Initial D (1998) (Hiromichi)
Trigun (1998) (Dick)
Master of Mosquiton (1998) (Dragon) (ep. 23)
Bomberman B-Daman Bakugaiden Victory (1999-2000) (Devil Slinger)
2000s
Wild Arms: Twilight Venom (2000) (Bounty Hunter A) (ep. 19)
Hellsing (2001-2002) (Dr. Trevilian)
PaRappa the Rapper (2001-2002) (Papa PaRappa)
Stratos 4 (2003) (PR officer) (ep. 10)
Ashita no Nadja (2003) (Ralph)
Monster (2004) (Suicidal Man) (ep. 10)
Starship Operators (2005) (Ricardo Faless) (eps. 3-4)
The King of Fighters: Another Day (2005-2006) (Iori Yagami) (eps. 1, 4)
Naruto (2006) (Yotaka)
Kaiji: Ultimate Survivor (2007) (Emcee) (eps. 11-12), (Store manager) (ep. 10)
Sgt. Frog (2007) (Giruru)
Golgo 13 (2008) (Danny) (ep. 34)
2010s
Naruto Shippuden (2010) (Gameru) (ep. 184)
Kaiji: Against All Rules (2011) (Middle-aged customer) (ep. 9)
Supernatural:The Anime Series (2011) (Zack Evans) (ep. 1)
Servant × Service (2013) (Superior) (ep. 1)
Attack on Titan (2013) (Preacher) (ep. 2)
Fate/Extra Last Encore (2018) (Lu Bu Fengxian)
2020s
Getter Robo Arc (2021) (Schwarzkopf)

Video Games

Iori Yagami in The King of Fighters series ('95 - XIII)
Iori Yagami in the SNK vs Capcom series
Uesugi Kenshin in Ikusagami
Ranford in the Langrisser series
Rospark the Floweroid in Mega Man ZX Advent
Jushiro Sakaki in Samurai Shodown: Warriors Rage
Zanzelman in Shinsetsu Samurai Spirits Bushidō Retsuden
Kusakabe Haroki in the Super Robot Wars series
Assassin and Berserker in Fate/Extra
Lu Bu Fengxian, Darius III, Eric Bloodaxe, Hector and Li Shuwen in Fate/Grand Order
Lu Bu Fengxian and Li Shuwen in Fate/Extella
Atsushi Sakai in Yakuza 5

Tokusatsu
Denji Sentai Megaranger (Nezi Black (ep 38-43, 48)
Kamen Rider Agito Movie (Ant Lord/Formica Pedes) (voice of Rider Chips, Katsumi Shiono, Yuuki Anai)
Juken Sentai Gekiranger (Five Venom Fist Confrontation Beast Snake-Fist Braco (ep 3-9), Mythical Beast Cerberus-Fist Kou (ep 43-44))
Samurai Sentai Shinkenger (Ayakashi Gozunagumo (ep 23-24))

Drama CDs
Kami-sama wa Ijiwaru Janai (Ryou Tateno)
The King of Fighters '97 Drama CD (Iori Yagami)
The King of Fighters '98: The Dream Match Never Ends Drama CD (Iori Yagami)
KOF: Mid Summer Struggle (Iori Yagami)
The Sun and The Moon ~ Prologue (Iori Yagami)
Samurai Shodown: Warriors Rage (drama) (Jushiro Sakaki)
Koishikute (Takeshi Hatano)

Dubbing roles

Live-action
Craig Parker
The Lord of the Rings: The Fellowship of the Ring (Haldir)
The Lord of the Rings: The Two Towers (Haldir)
Beyond Borders (Elliott Hauser (Noah Emmerich))
Con Air (Mike "Baby-O" O'Dell (Mykelti Williamson))
Kiss the Girls (FBI Agent Kyle Craig (Jay O. Sanders))
Liar Liar (Jerry (Cary Elwes))
The Matrix (Agent Brown (Paul Goddard))
Shining Time Station (Schemer (Brian O'Connor))
Snake Eyes (Gilbert Powell (John Heard))
A View to a Kill (2006 DVD edition) (Scarpine (Patrick Bauchau))
Where the Heart Is (Forney Hull (James Frain))

Animation
The Boondocks (Tom Dubois)
Teen Titans (Warp)
Ultimate Spider-Man (Norman Osborn/Green Goblin)

Radio Shows
 Sunstar Midnight Harbour (FM Yokohama/FM802) (April 2011 – present)

References

External links
Data at 81 Produce
 

Kunihiko Yasui on FM Yokohama

1960 births
81 Produce voice actors
Japanese male video game actors
Japanese male voice actors
Living people
Male voice actors from Nagoya
Japanese radio personalities
20th-century Japanese male actors
21st-century Japanese male actors